The South Florida Bulls swimming and diving program represented the University of South Florida in the sport of swimming. The program consisted of separate men's and women's teams which competed in NCAA Division I at the time of the program being discontinued in 1987.

The 1984–85 women's swimming team is the only varsity team in South Florida Bulls history to win an NCAA National Championship. The men's and women's teams also combined for 17 individual and relay national championships in their history.

Men 
The USF men's swimming team was founded in 1965 as one of the first teams to be sponsored by the young university. In the team's first NCAA Championship appearance in 1969, Joe Lewkowicz won the first individual national championship in school history in the 200-yard butterfly event. Two years later, the team would place second in the NCAA College Division. Members of the team would go on to win six individual national championships and one relay national championship.

Women 
The women's swimming team, known as the Lady Brahmans at the time, was founded in 1972 after the passing of Title IX.

1984–85 National Championship 
The 1984–85 South Florida Lady Brahmans team won the NCAA Division II National Championship, which was the first, and as of 2021, only NCAA National Championship in school history in any sport.

Every member of the team along with head coach Bill Mann and assistant coach Lou Manganiello was inducted into the University of South Florida Athletic Hall of Fame's inaugural class in 2009.

Roster 

 Nancy Bercaw
 Suzanne Crenshaw
 Susan Duncan
 Merit Greaves
 Tracey Hayes
 Dawn Hewitt
 Alicia McHugh
 Margaret Mortell
 Julie Muller
 Joni Troupe

Individual and Relay championships won

Men

Women

USF Athletic Hall of Fame 

14 men's and women's swimming coaches and athletes that were part of the USF swimming teams have since been inducted into the University of South Florida Athletic Hall of Fame. They include head coach Bill Mann, assistant coach Lou Manganiello, the 10 members of the 1984–85 women's swimming team, Joe Lewkowicz, and men's head coach Robert Grindey.

Folding 
Both the men's and women's swimming teams were disbanded after the 1986–87 season due to financial difficulties along with the sport not being sponsored by the Sun Belt Conference.

See also 
University of South Florida

South Florida Bulls

References 

swimming